Nat Howard is an American former Negro league pitcher who played in the 1920s.

Howard played for the Lincoln Giants in 1929. In six recorded appearances on the mound, he posted a 7.60 ERA over 34.1 innings.

References

External links
 and Seamheads

Year of birth missing
Place of birth missing
Lincoln Giants players
Baseball pitchers